Victor Jean Hugo (born 3 December 1975) is a South African professional golfer.

Golf career 
Hugo matriculated at Paul Roos Gymnasium in Stellenbosch, South Africa in 1994. Three years later he graduated with a bachelor of arts degree from University of Stellenbosch. He is the youngest son of organic chemist Professor Victor Hugo and Esme Hugo who were both active in sport and sport administration. He also excelled in rugby and cricket before choosing golf as a career.

Hugo played on the European Tour and had his best season in 2001 when he finished 34th on the Order of Merit.

Amateur wins
1998 South African International Amateur Match-play Championship
1999 South African Amateur Stroke Play Championship
Source:

Professional wins (21)

Sunshine Tour wins (19)

*Note: The 2014 Vodacom Origins of Golf at Arabella was shortened to 36 holes due to rain.

Sunshine Tour playoff record (2–2)

Challenge Tour wins (1)

Other wins (1)
2005 Wild Coast Sun Touring Pro-Am (South Africa)

Results in major championships

Note: Hugo only played in The Open Championship.

CUT = missed the half-way cut

Results in World Golf Championships

Team appearances
Amateur
Eisenhower Trophy (representing South Africa): 1998

See also
2015 European Tour Qualifying School graduates

References

External links

South African male golfers
Sunshine Tour golfers
European Tour golfers
Sportspeople from the Western Cape
People from Stellenbosch
People from the City of Tshwane Metropolitan Municipality
White South African people
1975 births
Living people